John Ross Mackay,  (偕約翰, December 31, 1915 – October 28, 2014) was a Canadian geographer. He is most noted for his explorations of permafrost phenomena in the western Canadian Arctic. His 40 plus years of study has enabled the building of pipeline operations and petroleum explorations in areas of frozen ground. The Royal Society of Canada stated the following when Mackay was awarded the Willet G. Miller Medal in 1975:
As a research worker with a superb talent of combining three elements – theory, design of simple but effective instruments, and skilled and careful field observations – he has met the challenges of applied science. In the field of permafrost studies he has attained a stature equal to the best from the USA and USSR and in so doing has enhanced Canadian science.

Early life
Mackay was born in Formosa (Taiwan) (then under Japanese rule) to George William Mackay and Jean Ross Mackay, as well as brother to siblings Leslie, Anna, Margaret and Isabel Minnie (1917–2012). His grandfather was George Leslie Mackay, who was instrumental in bringing Christianity and public health care to Northern Taiwan (Formosa). The Mackay Memorial Hospital was named after his ancestor.

Mackay completed a B.A. at Clark University in 1939. He obtained an M.A. from Boston University in 1941. That same year he left his studies to join the war effort. Mackay enlisted in the Canadian Army. Mackay completed training near Toronto and further training as a private (gunner) at a large artillery camp in Petawawa, on the Ottawa River. He was commissioned an Officer (Lieutenant) by 1942. Before the Second World War ended he attained the rank of major in the Canadian Intelligence Corps. He was stationed in Ottawa until he was discharged in 1946.

Career
In September 1946 Mackay joined McGill University's Department of Geography as an assistant professor.  His first paper on "The North Shore of the Ottawa River, Quyon to Montebello, Quebec" was published in the Revue Canadienne de Geographie, Volume 1 in 1947. In 1949 he obtained a Ph.D. from the Université de Montréal. Later that year he accepted a position at the University of British Columbia as an Assistant Professor with the Department of Geology and Geography. In 1953 Mackay was promoted to associate professor and became a full professor in 1957.

Mackay gained international scientific recognition through his experimental and field investigations in geography, and especially on the topic of permafrost. He published over two hundred scientific communications, adding extensive research contributions in the Quaternary sciences. From 1981 until his death he was an Emeritus Professor at the University of British Columbia, continuing to teach (voluntarily) a graduate course and undertake field research in the western Arctic, and has published over fifty papers in refereed journals.

Personal
Mackay married Violet Meekins in 1944. They had two daughters, Anne and Leslie. Violet died in 1997. Mackay died in Kelowna, British Columbia, at the age of 98 on October 28, 2014.

Past positions
 President of the Canadian Association of Geographers (1953–54)
 President of the American Association of Geographers (1969–70)
 Vice-President of the International Geographical Union
 founding Secretary General of the International Permafrost Association (1983–93)
 Chairman of the Board of Governors of the Arctic Institute of North America
 Honorary Member of the Chinese Society of Glaciology
 Honorary Member of the Chinese Society of Geocryology
 Honorary Member of the Geographical Society of the U.S.S.R.

Honours and distinctions
made a Fellow of the Royal Society of Canada
made a foreign Fellow of the Russian Academy of Natural Sciences
awarded the Scholarly Merit Award by the Canadian Association of Geographers
awarded the Roger J. E. Brown Memorial Award by the Canadian Geotechnical Society
awarded the G. K. Gilbert Award by the Association of American Geographers
awarded the Kirk Bryan Award by the Geological Society of America
The Canadian Geomorphological Research Group gives out the J. Ross Mackay Award annually
1967, awarded the Massey Medal by the Royal Canadian Geographical Society
1967, awarded a Centennial Medal by the Government of Canada
1972, awarded honorary doctorate from the University of Ottawa
1975, awarded Willet G. Miller Medal by the Royal Society of Canada
1977, awarded a Silver Jubilee Medal by the Government of Canada
1981, awarded honorary doctorate from the University of Waterloo
1981, appointed an Officer of the Order of Canada
1984, awarded the Centenary Medal for Northern Science by the Government of Canada, presented by Governor General Jeanne Sauvé
1986, awarded the Vega Gold Medal by the Swedish Society for Anthropology and Geography, presented by the Carl XVI Gustaf, the King of Sweden
1986, awarded honorary doctorate from the University of Victoria
1987, awarded honorary doctorate from the University of British Columbia
1991, awarded Logan Medal by the Geological Association of Canada
1993, awarded W. A. Johnston Medal by the Canadian Quaternary Association
2007, an issue of the journal Permafrost and Periglacial Processes (Volume 18 no. 1) was produced in honour of his 90th birthday
2010, awarded the first Lifetime Achievement Award of the International Permafrost Association

References

External links
Willet G. Miller Medal 
Geological Association of Canada Medals and Awards
Canadian Quaternary Association
Ross Mackay's 90th Birthday

1915 births
2014 deaths
Canadian geographers
Boston University alumni
Clark University alumni
Fellows of the Royal Society of Canada
Officers of the Order of Canada
Canadian Presbyterians
Université de Montréal alumni
Logan Medal recipients
Massey Medal recipients
Academic staff of the University of British Columbia
Canadian people of Scottish descent
Canadian people of Taiwanese descent
Presidents of the American Association of Geographers